James Taylor (born 13 May 1934) is an English former professional footballer.

Born in Strood, he began his career on the books of Charlton Athletic but made no appearances for them before a move to Gillingham. He made 30 Football League appearances for the Kent club, finishing as top scorer in the 1955–56 season, but made only one appearance the following season and then moved on to Watford. He left Watford without ever making a first-team appearance and there is no record of him playing for any other club at a professional level.

References

1934 births
Living people
English footballers
Gillingham F.C. players
Watford F.C. players
Charlton Athletic F.C. players
Tonbridge Angels F.C. players
Association football forwards